Twin Oaks is an unincorporated community in Alleghany County, North Carolina, United States. Twin Oaks obtained its name from a pair of large oak trees that stood near where the abandoned Twin Oaks Drive-In Theater now stands.

References

Unincorporated communities in Alleghany County, North Carolina
Unincorporated communities in North Carolina